Catherine Cassidy is an American writer and editor.

Catherine Cassidy may also refer to:
Cathy Cassidy, author of teenage fiction
Katie Cassidy, American actress
Kate Cassidy, character in Life Unexpected

See also
Cassidy (surname)